Tha Ngam is a subdistrict in the Wat Bot District of Phitsanulok Province, Thailand.

Geography
Tha Ngam lies in the Nan Basin, which is part of the Chao Phraya Watershed.

Administration
The subdistrict is divided into 13 smaller divisions called (muban), which roughly correspond to villages of Tha Ngam. There are 13 villages, each of which occupies a muban. Ban Tha Ngam is administered by a Tambon administrative organization (TAO). The mubans in Ban Tha Ngam are enumerated as follows:

Temples
The following is a list of active Buddhist temples in Tha Ngam:
วัดเสนาสน์ in Ban Suan Pan
วัดยางนาวราราม in Ban Yang
วัดเขาไร่ศรีราชา in Ban Kao Rai Sri Ratcha

References

Tambon of Phitsanulok province
Populated places in Phitsanulok province